Vidice is a municipality and village in Domažlice District in the Plzeň Region of the Czech Republic. It has about 200 inhabitants.

Administrative parts
Villages of Chřebřany and Libosváry are administrative parts of Vidice.

References

Villages in Domažlice District